Bertrand Milbourne Clark (29 April 1894 – 30 March 1958) was an all-round, amateur Jamaican sportsman, who excelled in golf, cricket and tennis, and was the first black person to compete at Wimbledon, in 1924.

Family 

Clark was born on 29 April 1894. He was descended from Thomas Milbourne Clark, his great grandfather, and Eleanor Fitzgerald, who married in 1824. Thomas was later described as "a free person of colour". Bertrand was the second son of Clementina Louise, née Sanguinetti, and Enos Edgar Clark, a dentist in Kingston.

He was educated at Kingston High School and then Jamaica College.

Sporting career 

Clark was a sporting polymath, and competed as an amateur.  He represented his school at high jump at the first Inter-Secondary Schools Championship Sports at Sabina Park in 1910, where he came first. He subsequently became known in Jamaica as a top golfer.

He played for Melbourne Cricket Club alongside his brother Ronald. He also played soccer.

He served as Secretary of the Jamaica Golf Association from 1941 to 1951.

Tennis 

In seven consecutive years he was the All Jamaica tennis champion. In all, he won seven singles, seven doubles and five mixed titles at the championships.

He beat the American Tally Holmes to take the American Tennis Association title, for African American players, in 1920.

At Wimbledon in 1924, where he was the first black player to complete, he was defeated in the first round by Vincent Burr. In his only other recorded appearance there, in 1930, he was beaten in the first round by Herman David.

During a royal tour of the British Empire in 1927, Prince Albert, Duke of York (later King George VI) partnered Clark in a game of doubles; this was unusual at the time and was seen as a display of equality between races.

Writing 

With his brother, he wrote several books on cricket. He also wrote about golf and tennis.

Personal life 

From 1911, Clark worked as a civil servant, retiring as medical secretary of the Island Medical Office. He was twice married but had no children.

He was listed in the Jamaican Who's Who for 1946.

He died on 30 March 1958. An obituary was published in the Sunday Gleaner, which said that Clark was "perhaps the greatest all-round Jamaican sportsman of our time".

Notes

References 

Jamaican male tennis players
Jamaican male golfers
Jamaican cricketers
20th-century Jamaican writers
Sportswriters
Jamaican footballers
1894 births
1958 deaths
Association footballers not categorized by position